Apamea pallifera is a moth in the  family Noctuidae. It is found in North America.

Apamea pallifera was originally described in Polia, but listed in Andropolia by Franclemont and Todd (1983) and Poole (1989). The holotype is a species of Apamea purportedly from Illinois. The comment from North American workers who have seen the type is that it is probably a Eurasian species. Eurasian workers say it is not Eurasian. It is possible that it is an extremely rare species that has never been recollected, a situation somewhat similar to that of Apamea smythi. The type has not yet been dissected but the form of the anal papillae put it with the Apamea species groups with blunt, rounded anal papillae.

Andropolia pallifera is listed as a valid name by some sources.

References

Apamea (moth)
Moths of North America
Moths described in 1877
Taxa named by Augustus Radcliffe Grote